Caitlin Compton Gregg (born November 7, 1980) is an American cross-country skier who has competed since 2001.

Career

Gregg starting Nordic skiing at Harwood Union High School in Duxbury, Vermont, as a sophomore.

Her best World Cup finish was 14th in the 10 km Freestyle in Canmore, Alberta in February 2010.

It was announced on January 19, 2010, that she had qualified for the 2010 Winter Olympics. She ended up placing sixth overall in the team sprint along with Kikkan Randall. Gregg's best individual finish was 30th in the 10 km event.

Gregg's best finish at the FIS Nordic World Ski Championships was third in the 10 km freestyle in Falun in 2015. Her second best finish was 14th in the 4 × 5 km relay at Liberec in 2009 while her second best individual finish was 48th in the 30 km mass start event at those same championships.

Gregg is the only five-time winner, male or female, of the American Birkebeiner ski marathon. She won the race in 2011, 2013, 2014, 2016, and 2018, skiing the 2016 race with a broken toe. Gregg set the course record in the women's freestyle technique in 2011 with a winning time of 2:15:26.0.

Cross-country skiing results
All results are sourced from the International Ski Federation (FIS).

Olympic Games

World Championships

World Cup

Season standings

Personal life
Since May 21, 2011, Caitlin Compton Gregg is married to fellow cross-country skier Brian Gregg.

References

External links

NBCOlympics.com announcement of the 2010 cross-country skiing team. - accessed January 20, 2010.
Caitlin Compton places 14th at Canmore World Cup 2010
Caitlin Compton's Bio on USSA Team Website

1980 births
American female cross-country skiers
Cross-country skiers at the 2010 Winter Olympics
Living people
Olympic cross-country skiers of the United States
Sportspeople from Vermont
People from Washington County, Vermont
FIS Nordic World Ski Championships medalists in cross-country skiing
21st-century American women